Francis Wallis Lipscomb (20 July 1834 – 3 October 1906) was an English first-class cricketer. Lipscomb was a right-handed batsman who bowled right-arm roundarm slow.

Lipscomb made his first-class debut for the Gentlemen of England against the Gentlemen of Kent and Sussex in 1857. Lipscomb's next first-class match came in 1862 for the Gentlemen of the South against the Gentlemen of the North.

During this time Lipscomb served in the British Army with the Royal Irish Regiment. In January 1859 Lipscomb was promoted to lieutenant. Sometime before 1881 Lipscomb was promoted to the rank of captain.

Lipscomb made his debut for Hampshire in 1881 against Sussex. In Lipscomb's second match of 1881, which also came against Sussex, Lipcomb made his only first-class half century. Opening the batting for Hampshire, Lipscomb scored 53 runs. Lipscomb's final first-class match came for Hampshire in 1882, once again against Sussex. In fact, all three of Lipscomb's first-class matches for Hampshire came against Sussex.

After his first-class career came to an end, Lipscomb was employed as a hops merchant. Lipscomb died at Southsea, Hampshire on 3 October 1906.

External links
Francis Lipscomb at Cricinfo
Francis Lipscomb at CricketArchive

1834 births
1906 deaths
People from Alresford
English cricketers
Gentlemen of the South cricketers
Hampshire cricketers
Royal Irish Regiment (1684–1922) officers
English merchants
Gentlemen of England cricketers
19th-century English businesspeople